Lonthoir is a village on the island of Banda Besar (one of the Banda Islands) in Indonesia.

Villages in Maluku

Villages in Indonesia
Banda Islands
Central Maluku Regency